Krendowskiidae is a family of mites of the order Trombidiformes.
Genera of the family include Geayia and Krendowskia.

References

External links
 

Trombidiformes
Acari families